Dolly Martin (born Dolly Read on 13 September 1944 in Bristol, England) is an English pinup model and actress. She is best remembered for her appearance in Playboy magazine and as the lead character in Beyond the Valley of the Dolls. She sometimes is credited as Margaret Read, Dolly Read Martin or Dolly Martin.

Biography

Career
Read's first onscreen appearance was in the 1963 film The Kiss of the Vampire, followed by a role in the British TV series Dixon of Dock Green later that year. In May 1966, she was Playboy magazine's Playmate of the Month. She posed for the magazine again in 1970. She also worked as a Playboy Bunny at the Playboy Clubs in Chicago, London and New York City.

After appearing in the low-budget erotic film That Tender Touch in 1969, she landed the lead role of the sexy but naive rock-and-roll singer Kelly MacNamara in Russ Meyer's comedy Beyond the Valley of the Dolls the following year.

Throughout the 1970s, Read appeared on television with guest-starring roles in shows such as Charlie's Angels, Fantasy Island and Vega$. She was a frequent panelist on the game show Match Game.

In 2006, Read, along with other cast members, provided commentary and was interviewed for the release of a special edition DVD of Beyond the Valley of the Dolls.

Personal life
In 1971, Read married American comedian Dick Martin. They divorced in 1974 and were remarried in 1978. She was a stepmother to his two sons, Richard Martin and actor Cary Martin. Dick Martin died on 24 May 2008.

Filmography

Films
 The Kiss of the Vampire (uncredited, 1963)
 That Tender Touch (1969)
 Beyond the Valley of the Dolls (1970)

Television
Dixon of Dock Green (1 episode, 1963)
Tattletales (1977)
Charlie's Angels (1 episode, 1978)
Vega$ (1 episode, 1978)
Match Game (1975–1981)
Fantasy Island (2 episodes, 1980)
The Match Game (1990–1991)

See also
 List of people in Playboy 1960–1969

References

External links
 
 

1944 births
Living people
English female models
English film actresses
English expatriates in the United States
English television actresses
Models from Bristol
1960s Playboy Playmates
20th-century English actresses
Actresses from Bristol